WWCN (99.3 FM) is a commercial radio station located in Fort Myers Beach, Florida, broadcasting to the Fort Myers area. WWCN airs a tropical format branded as "Playa 99.3"; until 2012, it was an alternative rock radio station, although the active rock flip was confirmed following the flip of sister station WRXK-FM to talk radio. Every December, the station hosted a concert called the "99Xmas Ball".

On June 20, 2013, the then-WJBX took over sister station WWCN's ESPN sports radio programming, with the rock format moving to sister station WRXK.

On May 28, 2021, WWCN changed their format from sports (which moved to WBCN 770 AM North Fort Myers) to tropical, branded as "Playa 99.3".

Previous logo

References

External links
Official Website

WCN
WCN
1983 establishments in Florida
Radio stations established in 1983
Spanish-language radio stations in Florida
Contemporary hit radio stations in the United States